FOX 29 may refer to one of the following television stations in the United States affiliated with the Fox Broadcasting Company:

Current

O&O 
WTXF-TV in Philadelphia, Pennsylvania

Affiliates 
KABB in San Antonio, Texas
KVHP in Lake Charles, Louisiana
WFLX in West Palm Beach, Florida
WUTV in Buffalo, New York

Former
WFTC in Minneapolis/Saint Paul, Minnesota (1988 to 2002)
WMUR-LP in Littleton, New Hampshire (1995 to 2001)